The 35th Academy of Country Music Awards was held on May 3, 2000, at the Universal Amphitheatre, in Los Angeles, California. The ceremony was hosted by Dolly Parton.

Winners and nominees 
Winners are shown in bold.

References 

Academy of Country Music Awards